Dárius Csillag (born 29 January 1995) is a Hungarian professional footballer who plays for Budaörs.

Club statistics

Updated to games played as of 15 October 2014.

References

External links

1995 births
Living people
People from Gyöngyös
Hungarian footballers
Association football forwards
Kecskeméti TE players
Budaörsi SC footballers
Soroksár SC players
Vác FC players
Dorogi FC footballers
Nemzeti Bajnokság I players
Nemzeti Bajnokság II players
Sportspeople from Heves County